Cryptotaxis is an extinct genus of conodonts in the family Cryptotaxidae from the Famennian (Upper Devonian).

References 

  Multielement Conodont Species from the Louisiana Limestone (Upper Devonian) of West-Central Illinois and Northeastern Missouri, U.S.A. Karl M. Chauffe and Patricia A. Nichols, Micropaleontology, Vol. 41, No. 2 (Summer, 1995), pages 171–186,

External links 

 

Ozarkodinida genera
Devonian conodonts
Fish of the Amazon basin